Zubanlı is a former village in the Jalilabad Rayon of Azerbaijan which is now part of the village of Təzəkənd.

References 

Populated places in Jalilabad District (Azerbaijan)